Islam Bibi (1974 – 4 July 2013) was a female police officer in Afghanistan in the Helmand province Headquarters and also a pioneer in the fight for feminism.

She was the highest ranking policewoman at the time of her death in Afghanistan and led operations against the Talibans. She received numerous death threats and was assassinated on 4 July 2013.

Life 
Bibi was born in Kunduz province in 1974. She was a refugee in Iran when the Taliban took control of Afghanistan in the 1990s. She returned to Afghanistan in 2001, then set about raising her family at home before joining the police against her family's will. This prompted her brother to try to kill her because he wanted to save the honor of the family name.

Bibi joined the police force in 2003 and quickly moved to the position of second lieutenant reporting directly to CID leadership which was an extraordinary achievement. She was the highest-ranking policewoman at that time and received many death threats. She led one of the largest police female squadrons in Afghanistan that chases after the Taliban, searching for costumed suicide bombers in burqas. They were first to break into any house during a search in women's areas where male police officers are not allowed. As police officers, they cover their faces with black scarves, wear thick boots, and in some cases choose to wear men's uniforms. Human Rights Watch says that female police officers often experience sexual harassment and verbal abuse by their male counterparts, in part because they lack even basic facilities. There are very few female restrooms at all police stations in Afghanistan, and women who use men's restrooms are highly vulnerable to harassment.

Death 
Bibi was shot when she left her home on the morning of 4 July 2013. She was attacked while riding a motorcycle with her son-in-law in Lashkar Gah, the capital of Helmand province. Bibi was wounded and died of her injuries in the hospital emergency room. No investigation has been launched to find out who was responsible for the shooting.

See also 
 List of unsolved murders

References

External links 
 AWID: Islam Bibi

1974 births
2013 deaths
Afghan police officers
Assassinated Afghan people
Assassinated police officers
Deaths by firearm in Afghanistan
Female murder victims
Incidents of violence against women
Pashtun women
People killed by the Taliban
People murdered in Afghanistan
Unsolved murders in Asia
Violence against women in Afghanistan
Women police officers